Hendrik Cornelis (Henk) Mulders (1 June 1904 – 13 May 1978) was a Dutch footballer. He played in two matches for the Netherlands national football team from 1930 to 1933.

Personal life
Henk was born in Rotterdam, the son of Cornelis Mulders and Hendrika Gerritdina Ridderhof. He was married to Catharina Afiena Cupido and had two children.

Career statistics

Sources

References

External links
 

1904 births
1978 deaths
Dutch footballers
Footballers from Rotterdam
Association football forwards
AFC Ajax players
Netherlands international footballers